DIN 1451 is a sans-serif typeface that is widely used for traffic, administrative and technical applications.

It was defined by the German standards body DIN ('German Institute for Standardisation', pronounced like the English word din) in the standard sheet  ('typefaces') in 1931. Similar standards existed for stencilled letters.

Originally designed for industrial uses, the first DIN-type fonts were a simplified design that could be applied with limited technical difficulty. Due to the design's legibility and uncomplicated, unadorned design, it has become popular for general purpose use in signage and display adaptations. Many adaptations and expansions of the original design have been released digitally.

Overview

The DIN 1451 typeface family includes both a medium and a condensed version; an older extended version has not been used since the early 1980s, but may still be encountered on older road signs in Germany. DIN 1451 is the typeface used on road signage in Germany and a number of other countries. The typeface has gained popularity due to its wide exposure through its release as a PostScript typeface in 1990. Since then, it is also used by non-governmental organisations and businesses. For graphic design and desktop publishing, several type foundries offer redesigned and extended versions of this typeface.

History

In 1931, the DIN institute published DIN 1451. It contained several standard typefaces for mechanically engraved lettering, hand-lettering, lettering stencils and printing types. These were to be used in the areas of signage, traffic signs, wayfinding, lettering on technical drawings and technical documentation.

The origins of DIN 1451  ('condensed face') for hand lettering date back to 1905, when the Prussian state railways prescribed a standardized lettering style for use on all of its rolling stock. Ten years later, the company – by then, renamed Prussian-Hessian Railways – additionally required that signage lettering on railway platforms and station premises also be rendered according to the 1905 master template. The DIN Committee of Typefaces was headed by the Siemens engineer, Ludwig Goller (1884–1964), who also led the central standardization office at Siemens & Halske in Berlin, between 1920 and 1945.

The design included not only the DIN , but also a DIN  ('medium[-width] face' – now very popular). A DIN  ('extended face') design was also included, but it has never been widely used.

In order to enable quick and easy reproduction, all drawings were originally based on a coarse grid and could be executed with compass and rulers. The  ('standards sheet') DIN 1451,  ('typefaces') was released preliminarily in 1931; then, with some minor changes in 1936, it was released as an official standard. In 1938, Temporary Order No. 20 required DIN 1451 to be used on the new German  (motorway) system. Due to this and similar regulations, DIN 1451 still dominates German public lettering today.

In 1923, Stempel was the first type foundry to produce printing type according to a DIN Standard. The design follows DIN 16, an earlier standard for oblique lettering on technical drawings, which had been released in 1919. In 1929, the Berthold Type Foundry released a similar typeface. DIN 16 had also been made available as lettering templates engraved in celluloid material for drafting use by the Filler and Fiebig company in Berlin.

Within the scope of public and technical lettering, the use of the DIN 1451 typefaces spread rapidly once they were adopted. They were released as celluloid lettering stencils for smaller applications, as larger metal stencils for application to machinery, vehicles and airplanes, and as cast metal lettering for street and building signage; nevertheless, printing type conforming to DIN 1451 have never been produced. During World War II, DIN 1451 was also adopted in the Protectorate of Bohemia and Moravia. The 1943 version of DIN 1451 added a set of Cyrillic characters, although their design did not match the weight and proportions of DIN .

Sans-serif lettering and typefaces styled around geometric shapes, along with Art Deco in general, was very popular in the 1920s and 1930s. At the Bauhaus, the use of coarse grids for designing typefaces was advocated by Herbert Bayer and Joost Schmidt during the Dessau period. Although of a similar design, the DIN typefaces did not incorporate the elegance of this stylistic trend.

Inspired by the DIN standard, a consortium of Dutch organisations created an equivalent lettering standard, NEN 3225. Created by a group of designers that included Jan van Krimpen, the design has no similarity to the DIN standard: it is a humanist family with serif and sans-serif styles. The sans-serif is similar to Gill Sans and to Johnston; the serif reflects the classical Renaissance humanist model. In a similar vein, the International Standards Organisation developed its own derivative, Isonorm, in 1980.

Releases 

The transferable-lettering-sheet company, Letraset made several variants available in the 1970s. Also, the Berthold type foundry adopted the DIN typefaces for their optomechanical phototype setting systems such as Staromat. In 1980, the DIN typefaces were redrawn by Adolf Gropp (1911–1996), a lettering artist from Frankfurt. The drawings were made on a finer grid. This enabled an exact definition of details such as the amount of overshoot of round characters (e.g. C, G and O) below the baseline and above the cap height. Also, characters such as S for which an accurate construction drawing had never been made were now defined using lines and arcs for the new cutting plotters that were to be used for the lettering on motorway signage. A number of the glyphs were changed, in particular those for "a", "6" and "9" as well as "t" in DIN .

By the mid 1980s, Linotype adopted the redrawn DIN typefaces for digital photocomposition. Together with Adobe, they released it as DIN  and DIN  in 1990. Thus, the typefaces became part of the Adobe/Linotype PostScript typeface library. The use of DIN typefaces started to appear in the work of cutting edge graphic designers and design studios such as Uwe Loesch in Germany, Tel Design in the Netherlands, as well as David Carson and April Greiman in the USA.

Third-party adaptations

With the popularity of the DIN fonts, with their minimal, modern design, several designers and companies have released their own interpretations and adaptations, often adding new weights such as light or extra-bold, and italics, causing a range of digital interpretations to exist.

One of the most famous and best-selling digitisations of DIN is FF DIN (1995), created by Dutch typeface designer Albert-Jan Pool for FontFont. Typographica editor Stephen Coles has particularly praised it for the quality of its hinting for onscreen display. Users include the New York City Ballet, ETH Zurich, The Verge and the film The Wolf of Wall Street. Unlike the original design, it uses conventional weight names.

As the original DIN design is out of copyright, other companies have offered digital releases (or obtained rights to resell Linotype's). Parachute (Latin, Arabic, Cyrillic, Greek), Elsner+Flake, Paratype (with Cyrillic characters) and others have issued revivals of some DIN styles, often upgraded with additional weights.
Fontsite renamed its release .

An extensive set of digitisations is that made by Peter Wiegel with donations requested from users under the OFL. This includes the regular style in two grades for printing with less and more ink spread, and the less well-known .
He also digitised the rounded DIN 16 Oblique and DIN 17 Upright Standard Typeface for Drawings using the names TGL 0-16 and 0-17, the names under which they were known in the German Democratic Republic.

Microsoft created custom digitizations of both  and  versions of DIN 1451 in 2013, but this version was never released publicly. The  source was completely rebuilt from the ground up by Aaron Bell of Saja Typeworks and was expanded in weight, character set and manual hinting. It supports Latin, Cyrillic, Greek, currency symbols, and some Coptic. It was first included in Windows 10 version 1709, and is primarily being used as the user interface font for Xbox software.

Ellen Luff designed the Bison typeface, inspired from the DIN 1451 typeface.

Parachute Type Foundry also designed the PF DIN Max Variable typeface, which also based on the DIN 1451 typeface.

American cybersecurity and data backup company, Datto, Inc. used D-DIN, a typeface which also based on the DIN 1451 typeface as their corporate typeface. The Sage Group enterprise software company have used a DIN-derived typeface in their logo since 1996.

Emil Karl Bertell designed the Praktika typeface, inspired from the DIN 1451 typeface.

Thomas Schostok designed the CA BND typeface, inspired from the DIN 1451 typeface.

In 2023, the Berlin-based Type Foundry, Fontwerk released the Neue DIN typeface designed by Hendrik Weber, Andreas Frohloff and Olli Meier. Neue DIN is an interpretation of the DIN 1451 typeface and has an overall compact appearance with a range of extreme widths. It is variable first and provides 81 static fonts which correspond to W3C’s CSS specifications.

Usage examples

Font for many license plates throughout Europe, but also Africa and Asia, including:

 Azerbaijan
 Belarus
 Cambodia
 Estonia
 Faroe Islands
 Indonesia (until 2022)
 Israel
 Latvia (with  used also in road signage)
 Lebanon
 Lithuania
 Moldova (until 2015*) + Transnistria
 Mongolia
 Niger
 Palestine
 Portugal + Cape Verde
 Romania
 San Marino
 Togo
 Tunisia
 Turkmenistan
 Vietnam
 Some variants in Cyprus, including Sovereign Base Areas (GB)
 Vehicle travelling outside Iran
 Some variants of French plates (current and pre-2009 format, as well as diplomatic, military personnel stationed in Germany, temporary)
 Some variants in Turkey
 Some variants of international organisations - United Nations, European Union and Council of Europe missions - and militaries (for example: Netherlands & France forces in Germany)

and older plates of:
 Albania *
 Belgium
 Bosnia and Herzegovina *
 Botswana
 Chile *
 Cuba *
 Georgia *
 Germany * 
 Ghana *
 Guinea
 Guinea Bissau
 Hungary *
 Kyrgyzstan *
 South Sudan *
 Uganda *

Other countries use slightly modified versions of the font:
 Austria (rounded)
 Czech Republic (narrower)
 Montenegro (notable differences for '1' and 'I')
 Slovakia (notable differences for '0' and '7')
 Spain (narrower)
 Old Italy (notable differences for '3', '4', '5', '6', '7', '9', 'G', 'M', 'Q', 'W')
 Old Poland (notable differences for '4', '6', '7', '9', 'K', 'M', 'W')

In several countries, marked with *, it has been superseded by FE-Schrift, a typeface developed specifically to hinder tampering.

See also
 Public signage typefaces

References

Further reading
 The series of articles "The history of the design of a contemporary typeface" in which Albert-Jan Pool published many of his findings on the history of the typefaces of DIN 1451 is a vault of references on this subject. The series was published in the e-magazine 'Encore', issues 13–15, 17–18. These are direct links to the article which were reprinted in modified form in Made with FontFont
 Industrial Archeology – DIN, the first German Corporate Typeface? 
 The Constructivist Connection – DIN, Bauhaus and the New Typography 
 
 DIN for All: From the Economic Miracle to Art and Vernacular Typography – FF DIN: New at the Start
 
 Albert-Jan Pool. FF Din. 1995
 Blackwell, Lewis. 20th Century Type. Yale University Press: 2004. .
 Friedl, Friedrich, Nicholas Ott and Bernard Stein. Typography: An Encyclopedic Survey of Type Design and Techniques Through History. Black Dog & Leventhal: 1998. .
 Jaspert, W. Pincus, W. Turner Berry and A.F. Johnson. The Encyclopædia of Type Faces. Blandford Press Lts.: 1953, 1983. .
 Macmillan, Neil. An A–Z of Type Designers. Yale University Press: 2006. .
 DIN 1451-2: Schriften – Serifenlose Linear-Antiqua – Verkehrsschrift. Deutsches Institut für Normung, 1986–02.

External links

 Download of fonts used on roadsigns
 A free implementation of Fette Engschrift, an early version of the DIN 1451 typeface
 A minisite from Fontshop regarding FF DIN, includes history and specs as well as an interview with FF DIN's designer Albert-Jan Pool.
 Weights overview of FF DIN and in-use examples
 Linotype DIN pages: DIN 1451, DIN Next, DIN Next Arabic, DIN Next Devanagari font family - Designed by Akira Kobayashi in 2012, Kimya Gandhi in 2012
 Parachute DIN: PF DIN Text Pro, PF DIN Text Arabic , PF DIN Text Universal, PF DIN Text Condensed Pro, PF DIN Text Compressed Pro , PF DIN Display Pro, PF DIN Mono Pro , PF DIN Stencil Pro, PF DIN Type System - Comparison Table
Fonts in Use: DIN 1451, DIN Engschrift, DIN Breitschrift

Government typefaces
Grotesque sans-serif typefaces
1451
Display typefaces